Muhammad bin Tughluq is a 1972 Indian Telugu-language political satire film directed by B. V. Prasad. It is a remake of the 1971 Tamil film of the same name, in turn based on the play by Cho Ramaswamy. The film, starring Nagabhushanam as the title character, was released on 11 February 1972.

Plot

Cast 
 Nagabhushanam as Muhammad bin Tughluq
 Krishnam Raju as Ibn Battuta
 Raavi Kondala Rao as Professor Ranganatham
 Raja Babu as Professor Ranganatham's son
 Sandhyarani as Professor Ranganatham's daughter
 S. P. Balasubrahmanyam as a singer (guest appearance)

Soundtrack 
The music was composed by S. Hanumantha Rao.

Reception 
A reviewer for Andhra Jyothi praised the plot, satirical dialogues, and Nagabhushanam's performance, while criticising the comedic subplots which were extraneous to the main plot. Griddaluru Gopala Rao of Zamin Ryot reviewed the film negatively criticising the lack of novelty in the political satire, plot holes and romantic subplots. However, he praised the performances of Nagabhushanam and Krisnam Raju.

References

External links 
 

1970s political satire films
1970s Telugu-language films
Indian films based on plays
Indian political satire films
Telugu remakes of Tamil films